Yevgeni Stepanovich Korolyov ( born 24 July 1978) is a Russian former professional ice hockey defenceman.

Career 
Korolev played 42 games in the National Hockey League with the New York Islanders between 1999 and 2002. The rest of his career, which lasted from 1994 to 2014, was mainly in the Russian Superleague and Kontinental Hockey League. After retiring he turned to coaching.

Career statistics

Regular season and playoffs

External links 

1978 births
Living people
Bridgeport Sound Tigers players
Chicago Wolves (IHL) players
HC Dynamo Moscow players
HC Lada Togliatti players
HC Neftekhimik Nizhnekamsk players
Metallurg Novokuznetsk players
Ice hockey people from Moscow
Lokomotiv Yaroslavl players
London Knights players
Louisville Panthers players
Lowell Lock Monsters players
New York Islanders draft picks
New York Islanders players
Peterborough Petes (ice hockey) players
Roanoke Express players
Russian ice hockey coaches
Russian ice hockey defencemen
Severstal Cherepovets players
SKA Saint Petersburg players
Torpedo Nizhny Novgorod players